Semyon Grigoryevich Morozov (Taganrog – 23 February 1943, Taganrog) was commissar of the Taganrog antifascist underground organization (1941–1943). He was posthumously awarded the Hero of the Soviet Union title. 

Semion Morozov studied at the Taganrog school No 15 for 7 years. In 1938, he graduated from the High Communist Agricultural School in Rostov-on-Don and was appointed chief of the Department of Agitation and Propaganda at the District Committee of Komsomol (Young Communist League) in the Kazanskaya stanitsa (Cossack village) of the Verkhnedonskoy District of the Rostov Oblast. In 1939 Morozov worked as deputy director at the Pioneers’ Club. Then he was appointed the chief of the department of propaganda and agitation at the City Committee of Komsomol. At the same time he studied at the Taganrog Teachers' College. Since 1941 he worked as the First Secretary of the City Committee.  He was engaged in the organizational activities in the occupied Taganrog. He was arrested in February 1943 and shot to death in the Gully of Petrushino. 

One of the streets in Taganrog was named after Semyon Morozov. A brass plaque is set on the wall of the house where he lived.

See also
 Taganrog during World War II

References
 The Encyclopedia of Taganrog, Second Edition, Taganrog, 2003

1914 births
1943 deaths
Politicians from Taganrog
People from Don Host Oblast
Russian people of World War II
Heroes of the Soviet Union
Resistance members killed by Nazi Germany
Soviet civilians killed in World War II
Executed people from Rostov Oblast
Executed Soviet people from Russia
Russian people executed by Nazi Germany
People executed by Nazi Germany by firearm